Nils Håkon Thomas Callerud  (born 15 February 1949) is a Swedish former competitive figure skater. A three-time Nordic champion, he represented Sweden at the 1968 Winter Olympics in Grenoble and at four European Championships.

Competitive highlights

References 

1949 births
Swedish male single skaters
Olympic figure skaters of Sweden
Living people
Sportspeople from Stockholm
Figure skaters at the 1968 Winter Olympics